Eksavang Vongvichit is a Laotian politician who served as Minister for Public Health.

References

Members of the 9th Central Committee of the Lao People's Revolutionary Party
Members of the 10th Central Committee of the Lao People's Revolutionary Party
Lao People's Revolutionary Party politicians
Living people
Year of birth missing (living people)